Wolvercote Halt was a railway station at Upper Wolvercote near Oxford on the Varsity Line. The London and North Western Railway opened the halt in 1905 and the London, Midland and Scottish Railway closed it in 1926. It was situated on the southern side of First Turn.

Route

See also
 Wolvercot Platform

References

Sources
 Wolvercote Halt on Disused Stations
 
 
 

Disused railway stations in Oxfordshire
Former London and North Western Railway stations
Railway stations in Great Britain opened in 1905
Railway stations in Great Britain closed in 1917
Railway stations in Great Britain opened in 1919
Railway stations in Great Britain closed in 1926